An-Sophie Mestach was the defending champion, but she withdrew before the tournament began.

Taylor Townsend won the tournament, defeating Yulia Putintseva in the final, 6–1, 3–6, 6–3.

Seeds

Draw

Finals

Top half

Section 1

Section 2

Bottom half

Section 3

Section 4

References 
 Main draw
 Qualifying draw
Taylor Townsend Stuns
Atlanta Teenager Wins Singles

Girls' Singles
Australian Open, 2012 Girls' Singles